Half Magic may refer to:

 Half Magic, a 1954 novel by Edward Eager
 Half Magic (film), an American film released in February 2018
 Half Magic, the alternate title of the 2020 animated film Onward in Japan